Isoindoline is a heterocyclic organic compound with the molecular formula C8H9N. The parent compound has a bicyclic structure, consisting of a six-membered benzene ring fused to a five-membered nitrogen-containing ring. The compound's structure is similar to indoline except that the nitrogen atom is in the 2 position instead of the 1 position of the five-membered ring.  Isoindoline itself is not commonly encountered, but several derivatives are found in nature and some synthetic derivatives are commercially valuable drugs, e.g. pazinaclone.

Substituted isoindolines
1-Substituted isoindolines and isoindolinones are chiral.  Isoindolylcarboxylic acid and 1,3-disubstituted isoindolines are constituents of some pharmaceuticals and natural products. Isoindolines can be prepared by 1,2-addition of a nucleophile onto a bifunctional ε-benzoiminoenoates followed by intramolecular aza-Michael reaction. Another route involves [3+2] cycloaddition of the azomethine ylides (e.g. (CH2)2NR) to quinone in the presence of suitable catalysts.  These methods have also been adapted to give chiral derivatives.

Related compounds
 4,7-Dihydroisoindole
 indole
 indene
 indoline 
 benzofuran
 carbazole 
 carboline
 isatin
 methylindole
 oxindole
 pyrrole
 skatole
 benzene

References